Leo Klein Gebbink (born 9 January 1968 in Zelhem, Gelderland) is a former field hockey midfield player from The Netherlands, who represented his native country in two consecutive Summer Olympics (1992 and 1996).

At his last appearance in Atlanta, Georgia, the midfielder won the gold medal with the Dutch national team. A former player of Kampong, he is married to the Dutch former field hockey international Jeannette Lewin. He earned a total number of 143 caps, scoring eight goals for the Netherlands during the 1990s.

References

External links
 
  Dutch Olympic Committee

1968 births
Living people
People from Bronckhorst
Male field hockey midfielders
Dutch male field hockey players
Olympic field hockey players of the Netherlands
Field hockey players at the 1992 Summer Olympics
Field hockey players at the 1996 Summer Olympics
1998 Men's Hockey World Cup players
Olympic gold medalists for the Netherlands
Medalists at the 1996 Summer Olympics
SV Kampong players
Olympic medalists in field hockey
Sportspeople from Gelderland
20th-century Dutch people